Jul or jol is the term used for the Christmas holiday season in Scandinavia and parts of Scotland. Originally,  was the name of a month in the old Germanic calendar. The modern English yule and yuletide are cognates with this term.

The term  is common throughout Norway, Sweden, Denmark, Iceland, Greenland, Scotland and the Faroe Islands.

Whereas the start of  proper is announced by the chiming of church bells throughout the country in the afternoon of 24 December, it is more accurate to describe the season as an eight-week event. It consists of five phases: Advent, and The End of Christmas, very often with Epiphany, the thirteenth day of Christmas, as the final day of the season. From the original beginning on Christmas Day, the custom of Julebord has spread to the entire season and beyond, often beginning well in advance of December.

The modern day celebration is largely based on the Church year and has retained several pre-Reformation and pre-Christian elements.

The central event in Scandinavia is Christmas Eve, when the main Christmas meal is served and gifts are exchanged. This might be due to the old Germanic custom of counting time in nights, not days (e.g. fortnight), as it holds for other holidays like Midsummer Eve (lit. 'Wake of St. John') and St. Olav's Mass (lit. 'Wake of St. Olav'), with the main celebration on the eve of the official church day.

Norse roots 

At this time, the animals for slaughter were the fattest, flour had been processed, all the work of autumn was completed, and it was time to celebrate.

The time of celebration has varied. According to written sources such as the legislation of Gulaþing, it was mandatory for farmers to have a beer-drinking party with at least three farmers attending. If a farmer was so far away from his neighbours that this was difficult, he still had to brew as much beer as if he had been taking part in such a party. The beer should be ready by November 1.

The tradition of Yule ale and "drinking " is symbolized by a drinking horn on December 25 on the Runic calendar, with an upside-down drinking horn depicted on January 13, symbolizing that the ale should be finished by then.

According to the wording of the legislation, there are two celebrations where beer drinking was mandatory. The first was a form of thanksgiving (where at least three farmers attended), while the second was a smaller party for the family.

The old tradition of brewing Yule ale and drinking in honor of the Æsir, friends, and kinfolk also remained in the time following Christianization, with the law demanding people to brew enough as well as strong enough. However, people were now to drink in honor of Christ and the virgin Mary instead.

Like the cookies traditionally left for Santa Claus today, it was customary to leave a bowl of rice porridge with butter for the  spirit in gratitude. The food represented a sacramental meal. Sacramental meals were formally called blót—in this particular instance, yuleblót or winterblót.

Common customs 
As usual in the western world, Christmas features Christmas dinner, decorated Christmas trees and the exchange of gifts. Remnants of customs from the older agrarian society include decoration with boughs of green from spruce or fir, e.g. on the doormat, and a sheaf of wheat hung outside.

Food 
Culinary traditions vary regionally. In Northern and Western Norway, pinnekjøtt (ribs of mutton which are salted and dried, and some places also smoked, and then steamed) is a common dish, whereas lutefisk and cod are popular in Southern Norway. Turkey has recently made its way into the variety of cuisines enjoyed during .

Families might serve several kinds of meat such as ham, fenalår (leg of lamb), cooked cured leg of lamb, pickled pigs' trotters, head cheese, mutton roll, pork roll, or ox tongue; and several kinds of fish such as smoked salmon, gravlax, rakfisk, and pickled herring. There will also be a range of cheeses and various types of jam. Gingerbread and gingerbread houses are commonly decorated with sugar frosting. In some instances, gingerbread cookies are used for decorating windows as well as the Christmas tree.

On Christmas Eve, many families eat risengrynsgrøt, a type of rice porridge that includes a single almond, scalded of its skin to leave it white. Whoever gets the almond wins a prize, usually a marzipan pig.

Breweries also produce a special soda, known as julebrus. Aquavit is also commonly served as a digestif to accompany the heavy, often fatty meals.

Phases of Jul

Julebord 
Julebord is a holiday banquet, often in the form of a buffet, at which is served traditional Christmas foods and alcoholic beverages. The tradition has its roots in the communal parties held in medieval Norway as part of the Gulaþing.

As times have changed since 1000 CE, the labor-intensive tradition of serving  at home is vanishing; the custom is moving out of private life to become an end-of-the year corporate social gathering, usually at a restaurant or a rented facility with ordered catering. In most cases employers only invite employees, not their families. There is typically one party for every employer and other organizations that one might be a member of, as well as large corporations inviting important clients, and non-alcoholic parties at schools and kindergartens.

Advent 
Advent starts with the fourth Sunday before Christmas.

December 1 to 24, it is common for children to have their own Advent calendar which contains one small gift for each day leading up to Christmas. Typically it contains sweets like chocolate, small toys or in later years Lego bricks encouraging building of a small piece of a larger Lego-construction throughout the calendar.

Little Christmas 
Many use this day to decorate the Christmas tree if they have not already done so. Some allow children to open one small present as a teaser for the day to come.

Julaften 
On , Christmas Eve, many families gather around the TV in the morning to watch the Czech movie Three Wishes for Cinderella (narrated by a voiceover in Norwegian by Knut Risan), followed by Reisen til Julestjernen (1976) and a Disney Christmas special. Some children get a Christmas stocking with candy when they wake up. Often, the parents use this time to prepare the Christmas dinner. Many families go to church before dinner, even many who never go to church otherwise. 
It is common to eat rice porridge for lunch, and dinner is usually at 5 p.m., when the church bells ring to symbolize the beginning of the main holiday. It is called , ''ringing in Christmas". 
After dinner and dessert (often leftover rice porridge mixed with whipped cream, called , served with a red berry sauce),  the gifts are opened.

Romjul 
 is the week between Christmas Eve and New Year's Eve, known in English as the 'Interscotia'.
All hunting, but not fishing, is prohibited on these days; during  ("Christmas Peace") there is a closed season on all wild animals.

The First and Second Day of Christmas (December 25 and 26) are holidays, and all businesses are closed.

December 25 is usually considered a very private holiday, when one sees only family. On December 26, it is fairly common to invite close friends over to help eat up what is left of the food from Christmas Eve.

Julebukk 
 translates to 'Yule goat'. Today it is commonly known as a goat figurine made out of straw, created in the beginning of December often used as a Christmas ornament. The Yule Goat's oldest representation is that of Thorr's magical goats, which would lead him through the night sky. The Yule Goat was also a spirit that would protect the house during Yuletide and it was tradition to sacrifice a goat to the Gods and accompanying spirits during the time span between the Winter Solstice "Winter Night" and the New Year called . Animal masks and skins, commonly goats and horses, were donned in an activity called "hoodening". Participants would parade from house to house, disguising their voices, singing, offering spiritual protection and warnings. The group would receive small amounts of money, food and drink in exchange for the blessing they offered.

New Year's Eve 
December 31 is commonly a half day at work. In the evening, families tend to have a dinner party similar to the Christmas Eve dinner, though it is common to invite friends and/or neighbours. As midnight approaches, it is common to leave the house and light up fireworks together with neighbours, as they congratulate each other.

End of Christmas 
The exact date that ends  varies. One common date is the thirteenth day of Christmas, Epiphany, of the Mass of St. Knut, on January 7. By Candlemas on February 2, the Christmas tree and all decorations have usually been removed.

See also 
 Advent calendar
 Norway at Christmas worldwide
 Jól (Iceland)
 Jul (Denmark)
 Jul (Sweden)
 Yule

References 

Celebrations in Norway by Bente Gullveig Alver and Ann Helene Bolstad Skjelbred - Norwegian Ministry of Foreign Affairs
Mål vekt tid - Arild Hauge

External links 
Christmas in Norway 
Julebord Parties in Norway 
Seven Sorts Christmas Cookie tradition and Recipes 

 
January observances
November observances
December observances
Festivals in Norway
Public holidays in Norway
Traditions
Winter events in Norway